is a 1984 laserdisc video game first developed and released by Taito and Malone Films for arcades in Japan and the United States. The game was later ported to the Sega CD video game console as Revenge of the Ninja in 1994.

Arcade game
The game tells the story of a skilled and daring teenage ninja named Hayate, infiltrating an evil castle in an attempt to rescue a princess he loves. Hayate must survive a collection of deathtraps and defeat a variety of mythological creatures and other adversaries on his quest to save the princess and destroy the castle.

The game draws players to guide Hayate with a joystick for moving him around and one button for using weapons through 15 different stages that take place in feudal Japan-based areas. There are three difficulty levels.

Like earlier laserdisc games such as Don Bluth's Dragon's Lair, Ninja Hayate contains traps and creatures that requires players to dodge or attack them at specific moments, by watching for the warning buzzer (like Dragon's Lair) in addition to flashing objects (e.g. arrows, buttons, light, etc.). If a player makes a mistake, one life decreases, and when players run out of lives, the game ends.

Unlike Don Bluth's laserdisc games, Ninja Hayate is animated with anime drawings by Toei Animation. Another difference is that the game flashes the buttons that need to be pressed directly on the screen. Sometimes it also flashes multiple possible button presses on screen, indicating different paths that the player can take. Another difference is that some traps are randomly generated, so that the game is not identical every playthrough.

Home versions
The Sega CD version was published by Renovation Products, Telenet Japan's North American subsidiary. Renovation sent "Master of the Ninja Arts" diplomas to players who mailed them photographic proof that they had beaten the game on hard mode. Revenge of the Ninja was also later converted by Ecseco to the Sega Saturn and PlayStation. These versions were released only in Japan as part of a double bill with Time Gal, another animated laserdisc arcade game conversion made by Taito, as Interactive Movie Action - Time Gal and Ninja Hayate.

Reception

In Japan, Game Machine listed Ninja Hayate on their January 15, 1985 issue as being the fourth most-successful upright/cockpit arcade unit of the month. The following month, it was the top-grossing upright/cockpit arcade unit in February 1985.

GamePro gave the Sega CD version a mixed review, considering the game to be inferior to Dragon's Lair and Time Gal with the gameplay lacking in "dramatics" and with "grainy and soupy looking" graphics. They said players "won't be disappointed" if they "like these types of games" but if they don't, they should avoid the game. The five reviewers of Electronic Gaming Monthly gave it a 32 out of 50 (8, 7, 5, 6 and 6 out of 10), commenting that the gameplay relies "more on memorization than anything else. Nice animation though." They said it "is more a treat to watch than to play."

Legacy
The original arcade version had no music except opening and ending theme. Entire music played on the Sega CD version were newly composed.

See also
The Legend of Kage
Time Gal

References

External links
 Ninja Hayate at Dragon's Lair Project
 
 Ninja Hayate at arcade-history

1984 video games
Arcade video games
Interactive movie video games
LaserDisc video games
Video games about ninja
PlayStation (console) games
Sega CD games
Sega Saturn games
Telenet Japan games
Video games developed in Japan
Video games set in castles
Video games set in feudal Japan
Full motion video based games
Toei Animation video game projects